Bakhmutske is a village in Bakhmut Raion (district) in Donetsk Oblast, eastern Ukraine, located about  north-northeast from the centre of the city of Donetsk. It belongs to Soledar urban hromada, one of the hromadas of Ukraine. It has been occupied by Russia since December 2022.

The village came under attack by Russian forces in 2022, during the Russian invasion of Ukraine. Ukrainian forces were reportedly pushed out of much of the village during a local Russian offensive against Soledar on 26 December. Bakhmutske was effectively captured by Russian forces on 27 December.

References

External links

Villages in Bakhmut Raion